Smestad is a station shared by the Røa Line (line 2) and the Kolsås Line (line 3) on the Oslo T-bane system. Although the two lines continue to share track some time after Smestad, passing the former station of Sørbyhaugen which was also shared, they diverge before passing another station. The next station to the west is Makrellbekken on Røabanen and the temporary station of Husebybakken on Kolsåsbanen. The next station to the east is Borgen. Smestad is located 4.6 km from Stortinget.

The station was originally the terminus of a branch line to Holmenkollbanen which was built from Majorstuen and opened on 17 November 1912. The line was extended to Røa in 1935 while the connection to Kolsåsbanen opened in 1942.

The station is on the southeast side of the intersection Smestadkrysset which includes the outermost ring road (Ring 3) around Oslo and there are some bus-to-subway connections possible at this station.

References

External links

Oslo Metro stations in Oslo
Railway stations opened in 1912
1912 establishments in Norway